Albert James Thornton (17 January 1856 – 14 June 1931), born Albert James Lee, was an English amateur cricketer who played first-class cricket between 1879 and 1891. Thornton played mainly for Kent County Cricket Club as well as amateur sides in Kent, Devon, Sussex and Hampshire. He worked as a stockjobber and was the grandson of the 19th century millionaire Richard Thornton.

Early life and professional career
Thornton was born at Folkestone in Kent, the second son of Richard Napoleon Thornton and his wife Margaret. He was educated at Winchester College, where he played some cricket, and at St John's College, Oxford before going on to work in the London Stock Exchange. He was commissioned as a Lieutenant in one of the volunteer battalions in the Royal Sussex Regiment in 1885.

Cricket career
Thornton played cricket for the Gentlemen of Devon and Devon County Cricket Club during the 1870s before making his first-class debut for MCC against Sussex at Lord's in 1879. He played five times for Sussex in 1880 before moving to play for Kent between 1884 and 1891. Thornton made a total of 30 first-class appearances, 21 of which were for Kent. He was awarded his Kent county cap in 1886, a year after his brother Richard Thornton. He also played non-first-class cricket for the Gentlemen of Hampshire.

Thornton was described in his Wisden obituary as a "good and free hitter and a useful lob bowler", batting right-handed and bowling underarm. He made one first-class century, scoring 137 for Kent against Sussex in 1887. He toured North America with EJ Sanders XI in 1885 as part of a team captained by his brother Richard, playing in both of the first-class matches on the tour against the Gentlemen of Philadelphia, and played in Portugal for a team led by Tom Westray in 1895.

Family and later life
Thornton was married twice. He married his first wide, Ernestine Alice Hawker, in 1877 at Honiton in Devon, the county where his parents had owned property at Knowle near Sidmouth. The couple had four children, two sons and two daughters. Ernestine died and Thornton married Rose Thompson in 1905 at Fulham. The couple had a daughter. Thornton's brothers, Walter and Richard, both played first-class cricket, Richard for Kent and Walter for Oxford University.

Thornton died at Kensington in London in 1931 aged 75.

Notes

References

External links

1856 births
1931 deaths
English cricketers
Sussex cricketers
Kent cricketers
Marylebone Cricket Club cricketers
Oxford and Cambridge Universities Past and Present cricketers
E. J. Sanders' XI cricketers